Aglaopus glareola is a moth of the family Thyrididae. The species was first described by Cajetan Felder, Rudolf Felder and Alois Friedrich Rogenhofer in 1874. It is found in Sri Lanka, and Borneo.

References

Moths of Asia
Moths described in 1874
Thyrididae